Godar Takht (also Romanized as Godār Takht) is a village in Nurabad Rural District, in the Central District of Manujan County, Kerman Province, Iran. At the 2006 census, its population was 77, in 17 families.

References 

Populated places in Manujan County